Empress Du (杜皇后) may refer to:

Empress Du (Jin dynasty) (321–341), personal name Du Lingyang, empress of the Jin Dynasty
Empress Du (Later Zhao) (died  348), personal name Du Zhu, empress of the Later Zhao dynasty
Empress Dowager Du (902–961), empress dowager of the Song Dynasty

Du